Turkeys voting for Christmas is an English idiom used as a metaphor for a situation in which a choice made is clearly against one's self-interest. In the United Kingdom, turkeys are commonly eaten as part of the English Christmas dinner.

History 
The Oxford Dictionary of Humorous Quotations writes that a commentator in the Independent Magazine traced the origin of the phrase to British Liberal Party politician David Penhaligon, who is quoted as saying: "Us voting for the Pact is like a turkey voting for Christmas" in reference to the 1977 Lib–Lab pact which he opposed.

The phrase was soon borrowed by other politicians and public figures. In 1979 Labour Prime Minister James Callaghan was faced with a vote of no confidence called by Scottish National Party, who were upset with Labour's treatment of the recent Scottish devolution referendum. In the resulting vote the Scottish nationalists sided with the Conservative opposition against the Labour government, despite the fact that the Conservatives opposed devolution. During his speech, Callaghan stated that "If they win, there will be a general election. I am told that the current joke going around the House is that it is the first time in recorded history that turkeys have been known to vote for an early Christmas." The Scottish National Party ultimately lost most of its representation in the resulting election. In 2000 British MP Teresa Gorman, who opposed the Maastricht Treaty, stated; "If the House of Commons voted for Maastricht it would be like 651 turkeys voting for Christmas."

Similar concepts 
In the United States, the phrases turkeys voting for Thanksgiving (that being the holiday when turkey is more commonly served) and chickens voting for Colonel Sanders are often used. In Canada, the story of Mouseland has mice voting for cats. A similar German idiom is "Only the most stupid calves would vote for their butchers" ("Nur die dümmsten Kälber wählen ihre Metzger selber"). Bertold Brecht alluded to it in his Kälbermarsch ("March of the calves", 19A33), a parody of the Nazi anthem "Horst Wessel Song", which was included in his play Schweik in the Second World War (1943). A similar photomontage of John Heartfield shows Hitler as a butcher with a chicken and the caption "Don't panic! He's a vegetarian."

In 2015, Twitter user Adrian Bott tweeted, “‘I never thought leopards would eat MY face,’ sobs woman who voted for the Leopards Eating People’s Faces Party,” which went viral on social media. The expression since became idiomatic of conservatives and right-wingers who face adverse consequences of their own policies. A popular 2016 New Yorker cartoon by Paul Noth portrays a sheep viewing a billboard of a wolf political candidate whose campaign slogan is "I am going to eat you," and approvingly remarking "He tells it like it is."

See also
False consciousness

References

Humour
British political phrases
1977 neologisms
Metaphors referring to birds
Christmas